Format of entries is:
 ICAO (IATA) – Airport name – Airport location

LA – Albania 

 LAFK – Tiranë Heliport – Tirana
 LAGJ – Gjader Air Base – Gjader
 LAKO – Korçë Northwest Airport – Korçë
 LAKU (KFZ) – Kukës International Airport – Kukës
 LAKV – Kuçovë Air Base – Kuçovë
 LASK – Shkodër Airport – Shkodër (Shkodra)
 LASR – Sarandë Airport – Sarandë (Saranda) 
 LATI (TIA) – Tirana International Airport Nënë Tereza – Tirana
 LAVL – Vlorë Air Base – Vlorë (Vlora)

LB – Bulgaria 

 LBBG (BOJ) – Burgas Airport (Sarafovo Airport) – Burgas
 LBBR       – Ravnets Air Base (military) – Ravnets, Burgas Province
 LBDB       – Dolna Banya Airport (private) – Dolna Bania
 LBGO (GOZ) – Gorna Oryahovitsa Airport – Gorna Oryahovitsa
 LBHS (HKV) – Haskovo Malevo Airport – Haskovo
 LBIA (JAM) – Bezmer Air Base (military) – Bezmer, Yambol Province
 LBKJ       – Kainardzha Airport – Kardzhali
 LBKL       – Kazanlak Airport – Ovoshtnik, Kazanlak
 LBLS       – Lesnovo Airport (private) – Lesnovo
 LBMG       – Gabrovnitsa Air Base (military) – Gabrovnitsa (Gabrovnica)
 LBMO       – Montana Airport – Montana
 LBPD (PDV) – Plovdiv Airport – Plovdiv
 LBPG       – Graf Ignatievo Air Base (military) – Graf Ignatievo / Plovdiv
 LBPK       – Pernik Airport - Pernik
 LBPL (PVN) – Dolna Mitropolia Air Base (military) – Dolna Mitropoliia / Pleven
 LBPR       – Primorsko Airport (private) – Primorsko
 LBPS       – Cheshnigirovo Air Base – Sadovo
 LBRD       – Erden Airfield (private) – Erden
 LBRS (ROU) – Ruse Airport – Rousse
 LBSD       – Dobroslavtsi Air Base (military) – Dobroslavtsi (Dobroslavci)
 LBSF (SOF) – Sofia Airport (Vrazhdebna) – Sofia
 LBSL       – Sliven Airfield (military) – Sliven
 LBSS (SLS) – Silistra Airfield (military) – Silistra
 LBSZ (SZR) – Stara Zagora Airport – Stara Zagora
 LBTG       – Bukhovtsi Airfield (military) – Targovishte
 LBTV       – Voden
 LBVD (VID) – Vidin Airfield (military) – Vidin
 LBWB       – Balchik Air Base (military) – Balchik
 LBWC       – Chaika Heliport (military) – Varna
 LBWK       – Kalimanci / Varna
 LBWN (VAR) – Varna Airport – Varna

LC – Cyprus 

 LCEN (ECN) – Ercan International Airport – Lefkoşa
 LCGK (GEC) – Geçitkale Air Base – Geçitkale
 LCLK (LCA) – Larnaca International Airport – Larnaca
 LCNC (NIC) – Nicosia International Airport (abandoned) – Nicosia
 LCPH (PFO) – Paphos International Airport – Paphos
 LCRA (AKT) – RAF Akrotiri – Akrotiri

LD – Croatia 

 LDDA – Daruvar Airport – Daruvar
 LDDD – Zagreb AFTN Airport – Zagreb
 LDDP – Ploče Airport – Ploče
 LDDU (DBV) – Dubrovnik Airport – Dubrovnik
 LDLO (LSZ) – Lošinj Airport – Lošinj
 LDOB – Borovo Airport – Borovo
 LDOC – Osijek Čepin Airfield – Čepin
 LDOR – Slavonski Brod Airport – Slavonski Brod
 LDOS (OSI) – Osijek Airport – Osijek
 LDPL (PUY) – Pula Airport – Pula
 LDPM – Medulin Airport – Medulin
 LDPN – Unije Airport – Unije
 LDPV – Vrsar Airport – Vrsar
 LDRG – Grobničko Polje Airport – Grobnik
 LDRI (RJK) – Rijeka Airport – Rijeka
 LDRO – Otočac Airport – Otočac
 LDSB (BWK) – Brač Airport – Brač
 LDSH – Hvar Airport – Hvar
 LDSP (SPU) – Split Airport – Split
 LDSS – Sinj Airport – Sinj
 LDVA – Varaždin Airport – Varaždin
 LDVC – Čakovec Airport – Čakovec
 LDVK – Koprivnica Airport – Koprivnica
 LDZA (ZAG) – Franjo Tuđman Airport – Zagreb
 LDZD (ZAD) – Zadar Airport – Zadar
 LDZG – Zagreb City Airport – Zagreb
 LDZL – Zagreb Lučko Airport – Zagreb
 LDZO – Zagreb ACC Airport – Zagreb
 LDZU – Udbina Airport – Udbina

LE – Spain 

 LEAL (ALC) – Alicante–Elche Miguel Hernández Airport – Alicante
 LEAM (LEI) – Almería Airport – Almería
 LEAS (OVD) – Asturias Airport – Asturias
 LEBA (ODB) – Córdoba Airport – Córdoba
 LEBB (BIO) – Bilbao Airport – Bilbao
 LEBG (RGS) – Burgos Airport – Burgos
 LEBL (BCN) – Josep Tarradellas Barcelona-El Prat Airport – Barcelona
 LEBZ (BJZ) – Badajoz Airport – Badajoz
 LECD – La Cerdanya Aerodrome – Catalonia
 LECH (CDT) – Castellón–Costa Azahar Airport – Castellon
 LECN – Castellón Aerodrome – Castellón
 LECO (LCG) – A Coruña Airport – A Coruña
 LECU (MCV) – Madrid-Cuatro Vientos Airport – Madrid
 LEDA (ILD) – Lleida–Alguaire Airport – Lleida
 LEEX –  La Cartuja Heliport – Seville
 LEGE (GRO) – Girona–Costa Brava Airport – Girona
 LEGR (GRX) – Federico García Lorca Granada Airport – Granada
 LEGT – Getafe Air Base – Madrid
 LEHC (HSK) – Huesca–Pirineos Airport – Huesca
 LEIB (IBZ) – Ibiza Airport – Ibiza, Islas Baleares
 LEJU – La Juliana Aerodrome – Seville
 LEJR (XRY) – Jerez Airport – Jerez de la Frontera
 LELC (MJV) – Murcia–San Javier Airport – Murcia
 LELL (QSA) – Sabadell Airport – Barcelona
 LELN (LEN) – León Airport – León
 LERJ (RJL) – Logroño–Agoncillo Airport (military) – La Rioja
 LEMD (MAD) – Adolfo Suárez Madrid-Barajas Airport – Madrid
 LEMG (AGP) – Málaga-Costa del Sol Airport – Málaga
 LEMH (MAH) – Menorca Airport – Menorca, Islas Baleares
 LEMI (RMU) – Región de Murcia International Airport – Valladolises
 LEPA (PMI) – Palma de Mallorca Airport – Mallorca, Islas Baleares
 LEPP (PNA) – Pamplona Airport – Pamplona
 LERE – Requena Aerodrome  – Requena / Valencia
 LERI – Alcantarilla Air Base – Murcia
 LERJ (RJL) – Logroño–Agoncillo Airport (public) – La Rioja
 LERL (CQM) – Ciudad Real International Airport – Ciudad Real
 LERS (REU) – Reus Airport – Reus / Constanti
 LERT (ROZ) – Naval Station Rota – Cádiz
 LESA (SLM) – Salamanca Airport – Salamanca
 LESB – Son Bonet Aerodrome – Mallorca, Islas Baleares
 LESL – San Luis Aerodrome – Menorca, Islas Baleares
 LESO (EAS) – San Sebastián Airport – Gipuzkoa
 LEST (SCQ) – Santiago de Compostela Airport – Santiago de Compostela
 LETA – Tablada Aerodrome  – Seville
 LETL (TEV) – Teruel Airport – Teruel
 LETO (TOJ) – Madrid–Torrejón Airport – Madrid
 LEVC (VLC) – Valencia Airport – Valencia
 LEVD (VLL) – Valladolid Airport – Valladolid
 LEVT (VIT) – Vitoria Airport – Vitoria-Gasteiz
 LEVX (VGO) – Vigo–Peinador Airport – Vigo, Pontevedra
 LEXJ (SDR) – Santander Airport – Maliaño, Cantabria
 LEZG (ZAZ) – Zaragoza Airport – Zaragoza
 LEZL (SVQ) – Seville Airport (San Pablo Airport) – Seville

LF – France 

 LFAB (DPE) – Dieppe – Saint-Aubin Airport – Dieppe
 LFAC (CQF) – Calais–Dunkerque Airport – Calais, Dunkirk
 LFAD (XCP) – Compiègne – Margny Airport – Compiègne
 LFAE – Eu Mers – Le Tréport Airport – Eu, Le Tréport
 LFAF (XLN) – Laon – Chambry Airport – Laon
 LFAG – Peronne-St Quentin Airfield – Péronne
 LFAI – Nangis – Les Loges Aerodrome – Nangis
 LFAJ – Argentan Airport – Argentan
 LFAK – Dunkerque – Les Moëres Airport – Dunkirk
 LFAL – La Flèche – Thorée Les Pins Airport – La Flèche
 LFAM – Berck-sur-Mer Airport – Berck
 LFAO – Bagnoles-de-l'Orne Airfield – Bagnoles-de-l'Orne
 LFAP – Rethel – Perthes Airport – Rethel
 LFAQ – Albert – Picardie Airport – Albert
 LFAR – Montdidier Airport – Montdidier
 LFAS – Falaise – Monts d'Eraines Airport – Falaise
 LFAT (LTQ) – Le Touquet – Côte d'Opale Airport – Le Touquet
 LFAU – Vauville Airport – Vauville
 LFAV (XVS) – Denain Airport – Valenciennes
 LFAW – Villerupt Airport – Villerupt
 LFAX – Mortagne-au-Perche Airport – Mortagne-au-Perche
 LFAY (QAM) – Amiens – Glisy Aerodrome – Amiens
 LFAZ (SBK) – Saint-Brieuc Airport – Saint-Brieuc
 LFBA (AGF) – Agen – La Garenne Aerodrome – Agen
 LFBC Cazaux [BA120] Cazaux, France
 LFBD (BOD) – Bordeaux–Mérignac Airport – Bordeaux
 LFBE (EGC) – Bergerac Dordogne Périgord Airport – Bergerac
 LFBG (CNG) – Cognac – Châteaubernard Air Base – Cognac
 LFBH (LRH) – La Rochelle – Île de Ré Airport – La Rochelle
 LFBI (PIS) – Poitiers–Biard Airport – Poitiers
 LFBJ – Saint-Junien Airport – Saint-Junien
 LFBK (MCU) – Montluçon – Guéret Airport – Montluçon
 LFBL (LIG) – Limoges – Bellegarde Airport – Limoges
 LFBM (XMJ) – Mont-de-Marsan Airport – Mont-de-Marsan
 LFBN (NIT) – Niort – Souche Airport – Niort
 LFBO (TLS) – Toulouse–Blagnac Airport – Toulouse
 LFBP (PUF) – Pau Pyrénées Airport – Pau, Pyrenees
 LFBR – Muret – Lherm Airport – Muret, Lherm
 LFBS – Biscarrosse – Parentis Airport – Biscarrosse
 LFBT (LDE) – Tarbes–Lourdes–Pyrénées Airport – Tarbes
 LFBU (ANG) – Angoulême – Cognac International Airport – Angoulême
 LFBV (BVE) – Brive–La Roche Airport – Brive-la-Gaillarde
 LFBX (PGX) – Périgueux Bassillac Airport – Périgueux
 LFBY (XDA) – Dax – Seyresse Airport – Dax
 LFBZ (BIQ) – Biarritz Pays Basque Airport – Biarritz, Bayonne, Anglet
 LFCA (XCX) – Châtellerault – Targé Airport – Châtellerault
 LFCB – Bagnères-de-Luchon Airport – Bagnères-de-Luchon
 LFCC (ZAO) – Cahors Lalbenque Airport – Cahors
 LFCD – Andernos-les-Bains Airport – Andernos-les-Bains
 LFCE (XGT) – Guéret – Saint-Laurent Airport – Guéret
 LFCF – Figeac Livernon Airport – Figeac
 LFCG – Saint-Girons Antichan Airport – Saint-Girons
 LFCH (XAC) – Arcachon – La Teste-de-Buch Airport – Arcachon
 LFCI (LBI) – Albi – Le Sequestre Airport – Albi
 LFCJ – Jonzac – Neulles Airport – Jonzac
 LFCK (DCM) – Castres–Mazamet Airport – Castres, Mazamet
 LFCL – Toulouse – Lasbordes Airport – Toulouse
 LFCM – Millau-Larzac Airport – Millau
 LFCN – Nogaro Airport – Nogaro
 LFCO – Oloron – Herrère Airport – Oloron-Sainte-Marie
 LFCP – Pons – Avy Airport – Pons
 LFCQ – Graulhet – Montdragon Airport – Graulhet
 LFCR (RDZ) – Rodez–Aveyron Airport – Rodez
 LFCS – Bordeaux – Léognan – Saucats Airport – Bordeaux
 LFCT – Thouars Airport – Thouars
 LFCU – Ussel – Thalamy Airport – Ussel, Thalamy
 LFCV – Villefranche-de-Rouergue Airport – Villefranche-de-Rouergue
 LFCW – Villeneuve-sur-Lot Airport – Villeneuve-sur-Lot
 LFCX – Castelsarrazin – Moissac Airport – Castelsarrasin
 LFCY (RYN) – Royan – Medis Airport – Royan
 LFCZ – Mimizan Airport – Mimizan
 LFDA – Aire-sur-l'Adour Airport – Aire-sur-l'Adour
 LFDB (XMW) – Montauban Airport – Montauban
 LFDC – Montendre – Marcillac Airport – Montendre
 LFDE – Egletons Airport – Égletons
 LFDF – Sainte-Foy-la-Grande Airport – Sainte-Foy-la-Grande
 LFDG – Gaillac – Lisle-sur-Tarn Airport – Gaillac
 LFDH – Auch – Lamothe Airport – Auch
 LFDI (XLR) – Libourne – Artigues-de-Lussac Airport – Libourne
 LFDJ – Pamiers – Les Pujols Airport – Pamiers
 LFDK – Soulac-sur-Mer Airport – Soulac-sur-Mer
 LFDL – Loudun Airport – Loudun
 LFDM – Marmande – Virazeil Airport – Marmande
 LFDN (RCO) – Rochefort – Saint-Agnant Airport – Rochefort
 LFDP – Saint-Pierre-d'Oléron Airport – Saint-Pierre-d'Oléron
 LFDQ – Castelnau-Magnoac Airport – Castelnau-Magnoac
 LFDR – La Réole – Floudes Airport – La Réole
 LFDS (XSL) – Sarlat – Domme Airport – Sarlat-la-Canéda
 LFDT – Tarbes – Laloubère Airport – Tarbes
 LFDU – Lesparre – Saint-Laurent-de-Médoc Airport – Lesparre-Médoc
 LFDV – Couhé – Vérac Airport – Couhé
 LFDW – Chauvigny Airport – Chauvigny
 LFDX – Fumel – Montayral Airport – Fumel
 LFDY – Bordeaux – Yvrac Airport – Bordeaux
 LFEA – Belle Île Airport – Belle Île
 LFEB – Dinan Trelivan Airport – Dinan
 LFEC – Ouessant Airport – Ushant
 LFED – Pontivy Airport – Pontivy
 LFEF (XAM) – Amboise Dierre Airport – Amboise
 LFEG – Argenton-sur-Creuse Airport – Argenton-sur-Creuse
 LFEH – Aubigny-sur-Nère Airport – Aubigny-sur-Nère
 LFEI – Briare Châtillon Airport – Briare
 LFEJ – Châteauroux Villers Airport – Châteauroux
 LFEK – Issoudun Le Fay Airport – Issoudun
 LFEL – Le Blanc Airport – Le Blanc
 LFEM – Montargis Vimory Airport – Montargis
 LFEN – Tours Sorigny Airport – Tours
 LFEO (XSB) – Saint-Servan Airport – Saint-Malo
 LFEP – Pouilly Maconge Airport – Pouilly-en-Auxois
 LFEQ – Quiberon Airport – Quiberon
 LFER (XRN) – Redon Bains-sur-Oust Airport – Redon
 LFES – Guiscriff Scaer Airport – Guiscriff
 LFET – Til-Châtel Airport – Til-Châtel
 LFEU (XBD) – Bar-le-Duc Airport – Bar-le-Duc
 LFEV – Gray Saint-Adrien Airport – Gray
 LFEW – Saulieu Liernais Airport – Saulieu
 LFEX – Nancy Azelot Airport – Nancy
 LFEY (IDY) – Île d'Yeu Aerodrome – Île d'Yeu
 LFEZ – Nancy Malzeville Airport – Nancy
 LFFB – Buno Bonnevaux Airport – Buno
 LFFC – Mantes Cherence Airport – Mantes-la-Jolie
 LFFD – Saint-André-de-l'Eure Airport – Saint-André-de-l'Eure
 LFFE – Enghien Moisselles Airfield – Enghien
 LFFG – La Ferté-Gaucher Airport – La Ferté-Gaucher
 LFFH – Château-Thierry – Belleau Aerodrome – Château-Thierry
 LFFI – Ancenis Airport – Ancenis
 LFFJ – Joinville Mussey Airport – Joinville
 LFFK – Fontenay-le-Comte Airport – Fontenay-le-Comte
 LFFL – Bailleau-Armenonville Airport – Bailleau-Armenonville
 LFFM – Lamotte-Beuvron Airport – Lamotte-Beuvron
 LFFN – Brienne-le-Château Airfield – Brienne-le-Château
 LFFP – Pithiviers Airport – Pithiviers
 LFFQ – La Ferté-Alais Airport – La Ferté-Alais
 LFFR – Bar-sur-Seine Airport – Bar-sur-Seine
 LFFT – Neufchâteau Airport – Neufchâteau
 LFFU – Châteauneuf-sur-Cher Airport – Châteauneuf-sur-Cher
 LFFV (XVZ) – Vierzon Mereau Airport – Vierzon
 LFFW – Montaigu – Saint-Georges Airport – Montaigu
 LFFX – Tournus Cruisery Airport – Tournus
 LFFY – Étrépagny Airport – Étrépagny
 LFFZ – Sézanne – Saint-Remy Airport – Sézanne
 LFGA (CMR) – Colmar-Houssen Airport – Colmar
 LFGB – Mulhouse–Habsheim Airport – Mulhouse
 LFGC – Strasbourg Neuhof Airport – Strasbourg
 LFGD – Arbois Airport – Arbois
 LFGE – Avallon Airport – Avallon
 LFGF (XBV) – Beaune Challanges Airport – Beaune
 LFGG – Belfort Chaux Airport – Belfort
 LFGH – Cosne-sur-Loire Airport – Cosne-Cours-sur-Loire
 LFGI – Dijon Darois Airport – Dijon
 LFGJ (DLE) – Dole-Jura Airport – Dole
 LFGK – Joigny Airport – Joigny
 LFGL (XLL) – Lons-le-Saunier Courlaoux Airport – Lons-le-Saunier
 LFGM – Montceau-les-Mines Pouilloux Airport – Montceau-les-Mines
 LFGN – Paray-le-Monial Airport – Paray-le-Monial
 LFGO – Pont-sur-Yonne Airport – Pont-sur-Yonne
 LFGP – Saint-Florentin Cheu Airport – Saint-Florentin
 LFGQ – Semur-en-Auxois Airport – Semur-en-Auxois
 LFGR – Doncourt-lès-Conflans Airport – Doncourt-lès-Conflans
 LFGS – Longuyon Villette Airport – Longuyon
 LFGT – Sarrebourg Buhl Airport – Sarrebourg
 LFGU – Sarreguemines Neunkirch Airport – Sarreguemines
 LFGV (XTH) – Thionville Yutz Airport – Thionville
 LFGW (XVN) – Verdun-Le-Rozelier Airport – Verdun
 LFGX – Champagnole Crotenay Airport – Champagnole
 LFGY (XTD) – Saint-Dié Remomeix Airport – Saint-Dié
 LFGZ – Nuits-Saint-Georges Airport – Nuits-Saint-Georges
 LFHA – Issoire Le Broc Airport – Issoire
 LFHC – Pérouges Meximieux Airport – Pérouges
 LFHD – Pierrelate Airport – Pierrelatte
 LFHE – Romans Saint-Paul Airport – Romans-sur-Isère
 LFHF – Ruoms Airport – Ruoms
 LFHG – Saint-Chamond L'Horme Airport – Saint-Chamond
 LFHH (XVI) – Vienne Reventin Airport – Vienne
 LFHI – Morestel Airport – Morestel
 LFHJ – Lyon Corbas Airport – Lyon
 LFHL – Langogne Lesperon Airport – Langogne
 LFHM (MVV) – Megève Altiport – Megève
 LFHN (XBF) – Bellegarde – Vouvray Airport – Bellegarde
 LFHO (OBS) – Aubenas Ardèche Méridionale Aerodrome – Aubenas
 LFHP (LPY) – Le Puy – Loudes Airport – Le Puy-en-Velay
 LFHQ – Saint-Flour Coltines Airport – Saint-Flour
 LFHR – Brioude Beaumont Airport – Brioude
 LFHS (XBK) – Bourg – Ceyzériat Airport – Bourg-en-Bresse
 LFHT – Ambert Le Poyet Airport – Ambert
 LFHU (AHZ) – Alpe d'Huez Airport – L'Alpe d'Huez
 LFHV (XVF) – Villefranche Tarare Airport – Tarare
 LFHW – Belleville Villié-Morgon Airport – Belleville, Rhône
 LFHX – Lapalisse Périgny Airport – Lapalisse
 LFHY (XMU) – Moulins – Montbeugny Airport – Moulins
 LFHZ (XSN) – Sallanches Aerodrome – Sallanches
 LFIB – Belvès Saint-Pardoux Airport – Belvès
 LFID – Condom Valence-sur-Baïse Airport – Condom
 LFIF – Saint-Affrique Belmont Airport – Saint-Affrique
 LFIG – Cassagnes-Bégonhès Airport – Cassagnes-Bégonhès
 LFIH – Chalais Airport – Chalais
 LFIK – Ribérac Saint-Aulaye Airport – Ribérac
 LFIL – Rion-des-Landes Airport – Rion-des-Landes
 LFIM – Saint-Gaudens Montrejeau Airport – Saint-Gaudens
 LFIO (XYT) – Toulouse-Montaudran Airport – Toulouse-Montaudran
 LFIP – Peyresourde Balestas Airport – Peyresourde
 LFIR – Revel Montgey Airport – Revel
 LFIS – Saint-Inglevert Airfield – Saint-Inglevert
 LFIT – Toulouse Bourg-Saint-Bernard Airport – Toulouse
 LFIV – Vendays-Montalivet Airport – Vendays-Montalivet
 LFIX – Itxassou Airport – Itxassou
 LFIY – Saint-Jean-d'Angély Airport – Saint-Jean-d'Angély
 LFJA – Chaumont Semoutiers Airport – Chaumont
 LFJB – Mauléon Airport – Mauléon
 LFJC – Clamecy Airport – Clamecy
 LFJD – Corlier Aerodrome – Corlier
 LFJE – La Motte-Chalancon Airport – La Motte-Chalancon
 LFJF – Aubenasson Airport – Aubenasson
 LFJH – Cazères Palaminy Airport – Cazères
 LFJI – Marennes Airport – Marennes
 LFJL (ETZ) – Metz–Nancy–Lorraine Airport – Metz
 LFJR (ANE) – Angers – Loire Airport – Marcé
 LFJS (XSS) – Soissons Courmelles Airport – Soissons
 LFJT – Tours Le Louroux Airport – Tours
 LFJU – Lurcy Levis Airport – Lurcy
 LFKA (XAV) – Albertville Aerodrome – Albertville
 LFKB (BIA) – Bastia – Poretta Airport – Bastia
 LFKC (CLY) – Calvi – Sainte-Catherine Airport – Calvi
 LFKD – Sollières-Sardières Airport – Sollières-Sardières
 LFKE – Saint-Jean-en-Royans Airport – Saint-Jean-en-Royans
 LFKF (FSC) – Figari–Sud Corse Airport – Figari
 LFKG – Ghisonaccia Alzitone Airport – Ghisonaccia
 LFKH – Saint-Jean-d'Avelanne Airport – Saint-Jean-d'Avelanne
 LFKJ (AJA) – Ajaccio Napoleon Bonaparte Airport – Ajaccio
 LFKL – Lyon Brindas Airport – Lyon
 LFKM – Saint-Galmier Airport – Saint-Galmier
 LFKO – Propriano Airport – Propriano
 LFKP – La Tour-du-Pin Cessieu Airport – La Tour-du-Pin
 LFKR – Saint-Rémy-de-Maurienne Airport – Saint-Rémy-de-Maurienne
 LFKS (SOZ) – Solenzara Airport – Solenzara
 LFKT – Corte Airport – Corte
 LFKX (MFX) – Méribel Altiport – Méribel
 LFKY – Belley Peyrieu Airport – Belley
 LFKZ (XTC) – Saint-Claude Pratz Airport – Saint-Claude
 LFLA (AUF) – Auxerre Branches Airport – Auxerre
 LFLB (CMF) – Chambéry Airport – Chambéry, Aix-les-Bains
 LFLC (CFE) – Clermont-Ferrand Auvergne Airport – Clermont-Ferrand
 LFLD (BOU) – Bourges Airport – Bourges
 LFLE – Chambéry Aerodrome – Challes-les-Eaux
 LFLG – Grenoble – Le Versoud Aerodrome – Grenoble
 LFLH (XCD) – Chalon – Champforgeuil Airfield – Chalon-sur-Saône
 LFLI (QNJ) – Annemasse Aerodrome – Annemasse
 LFLJ (CVF) – Courchevel Altiport – Courchevel
 LFLK – Oyonnax Arbent Airport – Oyonnax
 LFLL (LYS) – Lyon–Saint Exupéry Airport (formerly Satolas Airport) – Lyon
 LFLM (QNX) – Mâcon Charnay Airport – Mâcon
 LFLN (SYT) – Saint-Yan Airport – Saint-Yan
 LFLO (RNE) – Roanne Renaison Airport – Roanne
 LFLP (NCY) – Annecy – Haute-Savoie – Mont Blanc Airport  – Meythet
 LFLQ (XMK) – Montélimar Ancone Airport – Montélimar
 LFLR – Saint-Rambert-d'Albon Airport – Saint-Rambert-d'Albon
 LFLS (GNB) – Alpes–Isère Airport – Saint-Etienne-de-Saint-Geoirs
 LFLT – Montluçon – Domérat Airport – Montluçon
 LFLU (VAF) – Valence-Chabeuil Airport – Valence
 LFLV (VHY) – Vichy — Charmeil Airport – Vichy
 LFLW (AUR) – Aurillac – Tronquières Airport – Aurillac
 LFLX (CHR) – Châteauroux-Centre "Marcel Dassault" Airport – Châteauroux, Déols
 LFLY (LYN) – Lyon–Bron Airport – Lyon
 LFLZ – Feurs – Chambéon Airport – Feurs
 LFMA – Aix-en-Provence Aerodrome – Les Milles/Aix-en-Provence
 LFMC – Le Luc – Le Cannet Airport – Le Luc
 LFMD (CEQ) – Cannes – Mandelieu Airport – Cannes
 LFME – Nîmes Courbessac Airport – Nîmes
 LFMF – Fayence-Tourrettes Airfield – Fayence
 LFMG – La Montagne Noire Airport – Montagne Noire
 LFMH (EBU) – Saint-Étienne–Bouthéon Airport – Saint-Étienne
 LFMI (QIE) – Istres-Le Tubé Air Base – Istres
 LFMK (CCF) – Carcassonne Airport – Carcassonne
 LFML (MRS) – Marseille Provence Airport – Marseille
 LFMM (QXB) – Marseille FIR – Aix-en-Provence
 LFMN (NCE) – Nice Côte d'Azur Airport – Nice
 LFMO (XOG) – Orange Caritat Airport – Orange
 LFMP (PGF) – Perpignan–Rivesaltes Airport – Perpignan
 LFMQ (CTT) – Le Castellet Airport – Le Castellet
 LFMR (BAE) – Barcelonnette – Saint-Pons Airport – Barcelonnette
 LFMS (XAS) – Alès Deaux Airport – Alès
 LFMT (MPL) – Montpellier–Méditerranée Airport – Mauguio
 LFMU (BZR) – Béziers Cap d'Agde Airport – Béziers
 LFMV (AVN) – Avignon – Provence Airport – Avignon
 LFMW – Castelnaudary – Villeneuve Airport – Castelnaudary
 LFMX – Château-Arnoux-Saint-Auban Airport – Château-Arnoux-Saint-Auban
 LFMZ – Lézignan-Corbières Airport – Lézignan-Corbières
 LFNA (GAT) – Gap Tallard Airport – Gap
 LFNB (MEN) – Mende Brenoux Airport – Mende
 LFNC – Mont-Dauphin – Saint-Crépin Airport – Mont-Dauphin
 LFND – Pont-Saint-Esprit Airport – Pont-Saint-Esprit
 LFNE – Salon Eyguières Airport – Salon
 LFNF – Vinon Airport – Vinon
 LFNG – Montpellier Candillargues Airport – Montpellier
 LFNH – Carpentras Airport – Carpentras
 LFNJ – Aspres-sur-Buëch Airport – Aspres-sur-Buëch
 LFNL – Saint-Martin-de-Londres Airport – Saint-Martin-de-Londres
 LFNO – Florac Sainte-Enimie Airport – Florac
 LFNP – Pézenas Nizas Airport – Pézenas
 LFNQ (QZE) – Mont-Louis La Quillane Airport – Mont-Louis
 LFNR – Berre La Fare Airport – Berre
 LFNS – Sisteron Thèze Airport – Sisteron
 LFNT – Avignon Pujaut Airport – Avignon
 LFNU – Uzès Airport – Uzès
 LFNV – Valréas Visan Airport – Valréas
 LFNW – Puivert Airport – Puivert
 LFNX – Bédarieux La Tour-sur-Orb Airport – Bédarieux
 LFNZ – Le Mazet-de-Romanin Airport – Le Mazet
 LFOA – Avord Air Base – Avord
 LFOB (BVA) – Beauvais–Tillé Airport – Beauvais
 LFOC – Châteaudun Air Base – Châteaudun
 LFOD (XSU) – Saumur Saint-Florent Airport – Saumur
 LFOE (EVX) – Évreux Fauville Airport – Évreux
 LFOF (XAN) – Alençon Valframbert Airport – Alençon
 LFOG – Flers Saint-Paul Airport – Flers
 LFOH (LEH) – Le Havre – Octeville Airport – Le Havre
 LFOI (XAB) – Aerodrome Abbeville – Abbeville
 LFOJ (ORE) – Orléans – Bricy Air Base – Orléans
 LFOK (XCR) – Châlons Vatry Airport – Châlons-en-Champagne
 LFOL – L'Aigle Saint-Michel Airport – L'Aigle
 LFOM – Lessay Airport – Lessay
 LFON – Vernouillet Airport – Dreux
 LFOO (LSO) – Les Sables-d'Olonne Talmont Airport – Les Sables-d'Olonne
 LFOP (URO) – Rouen Airport – Rouen
 LFOQ (XBQ) – Blois Le Breuil Airport – Blois
 LFOR (QTJ) – Chartres – Champhol Aerodrome – Chartres
 LFOS – Saint-Valery Vittefleur Airport – Saint-Valery
 LFOT (TUF) – Tours Val de Loire Airport – Tours
 LFOU (CET) – Cholet Le Pontreau Airport – Cholet
 LFOV (LVA) – Laval Entrammes Airport – Laval
 LFOW – Saint-Quentin Roupy Airport – Saint-Quentin
 LFOX – Étampes – Montdésir Airport – Étampes
 LFOY – Le Havre Saint-Romain Airport – Le Havre
 LFOZ – Orléans Saint-Denis-de-l'Hotel Airport – Orléans
 LFPA – Persan-Beaumont Airport – Persan, Beaumont
 LFPB (LBG) – Paris–Le Bourget Airport – Paris
 LFPC (CSF) – Creil Airport – Creil
 LFPD (XBX) – Bernay–St Martin Airport – Bernay, Eure
 LFPE – Meaux Esbly Airport – Meaux
 LFPF – Beynes Thiverval Airport – Beynes
 LFPG (CDG) – Charles de Gaulle Airport (Roissy Airport) – Paris
 LFPH – Chelles Le Pin Airport – Chelles
 LFPI – Paris Issy-les-Moulineaux Airport – Paris
 LFPK – Coulommiers – Voisins Aerodrome – Coulommiers
 LFPL (XLG) – Lognes Emerainville aerodrome – Lognes
 LFPM – Melun Villaroche Aerodrome – Melun
 LFPN (TNF) – Toussus-le-Noble Airport – Toussus-le-Noble
 LFPO (ORY) – Orly Airport – Orly (near Paris)
 LFPP – Le Plessis-Belleville Airport – Le Plessis-Belleville
 LFPQ – Fontenay Tresigny Airport – Fontenay-Trésigny
 LFPT (POX) – Pontoise – Cormeilles Aerodrome – Pontoise
 LFPU – Moret Episy Airport – Moret-sur-Loing
 LFPV – Vélizy – Villacoublay Air Base – Vélizy-Villacoublay
 LFPX – Chavenay Villepreux Airport – Chavenay
 LFPY – Brétigny-sur-Orge Air Base – Brétigny-sur-Orge
 LFPZ – Saint-Cyr-l'École Airport – Saint-Cyr-l'École
 LFQA – Reims – Prunay Aerodrome – Reims
 LFQB (QYR) – Troyes – Barberey Airport – Troyes
 LFQC – Lunéville-Croismare Airport – Lunéville
 LFQD (QRV) – Arras – Roclincourt Airport – Arras
 LFQF – Autun Bellevue Airport – Autun
 LFQG (NVS) – Nevers Fourchambault Airport – Nevers
 LFQH – Châtillon-sur-Seine Airport – Châtillon-sur-Seine
 LFQI (XCB) – Cambrai Epinoy Airport – Cambrai
 LFQJ (XME) – Maubeuge Elesmes Airport – Maubeuge
 LFQK – Châlons Écury-sur-Coole Airport – Châlons-en-Champagne
 LFQL (XLE) – Lens Benifontaine Airport – Lens
 LFQM – Besançon La Veze Airport – Besançon
 LFQN (XSG) – Saint-Omer Wizernes Airport – Saint-Omer
 LFQO – Lille Marcq-en-Baroeul Airport – Lille
 LFQQ (LIL) – Lille Airport – Lille
 LFQR – Romilly-sur-Seine Airport – Romilly-sur-Seine
 LFQS – Vitry-en-Artois Airfield – Vitry-en-Artois
 LFQT (HZB) – Merville Calonne Airport – Merville / Hazebrouck
 LFQU – Sarre-Union Airport – Sarre-Union
 LFQV (XCZ) – Charleville-Mézières Airport – Charleville-Mézières
 LFQW (XVO) – Vesoul Frotey Airport – Vesoul
 LFQX – Juvancourt Airport – Juvancourt
 LFQY – Saverne Steinbourg Airport – Saverne
 LFQZ – Dieuze Gueblange Airport – Dieuze
 LFRA (ANE) – Angers Avrille Airport – Angers (closed in 2003)
 LFRB (BES) – Brest Bretagne Airport – Brest
 LFRC (CER) – Cherbourg – Maupertus Airport – Cherbourg-Octeville
 LFRD (DNR) – Dinard–Pleurtuit–Saint-Malo Airport – Dinard
 LFRE (LBY) – La Baule-Escoublac Airport – La Baule-Escoublac
 LFRF (GFR) – Granville-Mont Saint-Michel Aerodrome – Granville
 LFRG (DOL) – Deauville – Normandie Airport – Deauville
 LFRH (LRT) – Lorient South Brittany Airport – Lorient
 LFRI (EDM) – La Roche-sur-Yon Les Ajoncs Airport – La Roche-sur-Yon
 LFRJ (LDV) – Landivisiau Airport – Landivisiau
 LFRK (CFR) – Caen – Carpiquet Airport – Caen
 LFRM (LME) – Le Mans Arnage Airport – Le Mans
 LFRN (RNS) – Rennes–Saint-Jacques Airport – Rennes
 LFRO (LAI) – Lannion – Côte de Granit Airport  – Lannion
 LFRP – Ploermel Loyat Airport – Ploërmel
 LFRQ (UIP) – Quimper–Cornouaille Airport – Quimper
 LFRS (NTE) – Nantes Atlantique Airport (formerly Aéroport Château Bougon) – Nantes
 LFRT (SBK) – Saint-Brieuc – Armor Airport – Saint-Brieuc
 LFRU (MXN) – Morlaix – Ploujean Airport – Morlaix
 LFRV (VNE) – Meucon Airport – Vannes
 LFRW – Avranches Le Val Saint-Pere Airport – Avranches
 LFRZ (SNR) – Saint-Nazaire Montoir Airport – Saint-Nazaire
 LFSA (QBQ) – Besançon Thise Airport – Besançon
 LFSB (BSL) – EuroAirport Basel Mulhouse Freiburg  – Mulhouse, France / Basel, Switzerland – also IATA code MLH
 LFSD (DIJ) – Dijon Air Base – Dijon
 LFSE – Épinal Dogneville Airport – Épinal
 LFSF (MZM) – Metz Frescaty Airport – Metz closed 2012
 LFSG (EPL) – Épinal – Mirecourt Airport – Épinal
 LFSH – Haguenau Airport – Haguenau
 LFSJ (XSW) – Sedan Douzy Airport – Sedan
 LFSK – Vitry-le-François Vauclerc Airport – Vitry-le-François
 LFSM (XMF) – Montbéliard – Courcelles Aerodrome – Montbéliard
 LFSN (ENC) – Nancy-Essey Airport – Nancy
 LFSP – Pontarlier Airport – Pontarlier
 LFSQ (BOR) – Belfort Fontaine Airport – Belfort
 LFSR (RHE) – Reims – Champagne Air Base – Reims
 LFST (SXB) – Strasbourg Airport – Strasbourg
 LFSU – Langres Rolampont Airport – Langres
 LFSV – Pont-Saint-Vincent Airport – Pont-Saint-Vincent
 LFSW (XEP) – Épernay Plivot Airport – Épernay
 LFSY – Cessey Airport – Cessey
 LFSZ (VTL) – Vittel Champ-de-Courses Airport – Vittel
 LFTB – Marignane Berre Airport – Marignane
 LFTF – Cuers Pierrefeu Airport – Cuers
 LFTH (TLN) – Toulon–Hyères Airport (Hyères Le Palyvestre Airport) – Toulon
 LFTM – Serres La Batie Montsaleon Airport – Serres-la-Batie
 LFTN – La Grand'Combe Airport – La Grand-Combe
 LFTP – Puimoisson Airport – Puimoisson
 LFTQ – Châteaubriant Pouance Airport – Châteaubriant
 LFTR – Toulon-St. Mandrier Heliport – Saint-Mandrier-sur-Mer
 LFTU (FRJ) – Fréjus Saint-Raphael Airport – Fréjus
 LFTW (FNI) – Nîmes–Alès–Camargue–Cévennes Airport (Garons Airport) – Nîmes
 LFTZ (LTT) – La Môle – Saint-Tropez Airport – La Môle
 LFXA – Ambérieu-en-Bugey Air Base – Ambérieu-en-Bugey
 LFXB (XST) – Saintes Thenac Airport – Saintes
 LFXM – Mourmelon Airport – Mourmelon
 LFXN (XNA) – Narbonne Airport – Narbonne
 LFXU – Les Mureaux Airport – Les Mureaux
 LFYG – Cambrai-Niergnies Airport – Cambrai
 LFYR – Romorantin Pruniers Airport – Romorantin
 LFYS – Sainte-Léocadie Airport – Sainte-Léocadie

Saint Pierre and Miquelon 

 LFVM (MQC) – Miquelon Airport – Miquelon
 LFVP (FSP) – Saint-Pierre Airport – Saint-Pierre

LG – Greece 

 LGAD (PYR) – Andravida Airport – Andravida (military)
 LGAG (AGQ) – Agrinion Airport – Agrinion
 LGAL (AXD) – Alexandroupolis Airport, "Dimokritos" (Democritus) – Alexandroupolis
 LGAT (ATH) – Ellinikon International Airport (closed in 2001) – Athens
 LGAV (ATH) – Athens International Airport, "Eleftherios Venizelos" – Athens (Athina)
 LGAX (---) – Alexandria Airport (Greece) – Alexandreia, Greece
 LGBL (VOL) – Nea Anchialos National Airport (Volos Central Greece Airport) – Nea Anchialos/Volos
 LGEL (---) – Elfesis Airport – Elfesis/Eleusis(military)
 LGEP (---) – Epitalio Airport – Epitalio (closed)
 LGHI (JKH) – Chios Island National Airport, "Omiros" – Chios
 LGHL (PKH) – Porto Cheli Airport – Porto Cheli (closed in 2006, private), Argolis
 LGIK (JIK) – Ikaria Island National Airport, "Ikaros" (Icarus) – Ikaria
 LGIO (IOA) – Ioannina International Airport, "King Pyrrhus" – Ioannina
 LGIR (HER) – Heraklion International Airport, "Nikos Kazantzakis" – Heraklion (Iraklion), Crete
 LGKA (KSO) – Kastoria National Airport, "Aristotelis" (Aristotle) – Kastoria
 LGKC (KIT) – Kithira Island National Airport, "Alexandros Aristotelous Onassis" – Kythira (Kithira)
 LGKF (EFL) – Kefalonia International Airport, "Anna Pollatou" – Kefalonia (Kefallinia, Cephallonia)
 LGKJ (KZS) – Kastellorizo Island Public Airport, "Megisti" – Kastellorizo
 LGKL (KLX) – Kalamata International Airport, "Captain Vassilis Constanțakopoulos" – Kalamata
 LGKM (---) – Amigdaleon – Kavala (military, closed)
 LGKN (---) – Kotroni Airport – Marathon(military)
 LGKO (KGS) – Kos Island International Airport, "Ippokratis" (Hippocrates) – Kos
 LGKP (AOK) – Karpathos Island National Airport – Karpathos
 LGKR (CFU) – Corfu International Airport, "Ioannis Kapodistrias " – Corfu (Kerkyra, Kerkira)
 LGKS (KSJ) – Kasos Island Public Airport, "Agia Marina" – Kasos (Kassos)
 LGKV (KVA) – Kavala International Airport, "Megas Alexandros" (Alexander the Great) – Kavala
 LGKY (JKL) – Kalymnos Island National Airport, "Pothia" – Kalimnos
 LGKZ (KZI) – Kozani National Airport, "Filippos" (Philip II) – Kozani
 LGLE (LRS) – Leros Municipal Airport, "Dodekanisos" – Leros
 LGLM (LXS) – Lemnos International Airport, "Ifaestos" (Hephaestus) – Lemnos (Limnos)
 LGLR (LRA) – Larissa National Airport, "Thessaly" – Larissa (military)
 LGMG (---) – Megara Airport – Megara (military and national general aviation only)
 LGMK (JMK) – Mykonos Island National Airport, "Dilos" – Mykonos (Mikonos)
 LGML (MLO) – Milos Island National Airport, "Afroditi" (Aphrodite) – Milos
 LGMT (MJT) – Mytilene International Airport, "Odysseas Elytis" – Mytilene (Mitilini), Lesbos
 LGNX (JNX) – Naxos Island National Airport, "Apollon" (Apollo) – Naxos
 LGPA (PAS) – Paros National Airport, "Panteleou" – Paros
 LGPL (JTY) – Astypalaia Island National Airport, "Panaghia" – Analipsis, Astypalaia
 LGPZ (PVK) – Aktion National Airport (Preveza Airport) – Prevesa/Lefkada
 LGRD (---) – Rhodes Maritsa Airport – Maritsa, Rhodes (military)
 LGRP (RHO) – Rhodes International Airport, "Diagoras" – Rhodes (Rhodos, Rodos)
 LGRX (GPA) – Araxos Airport, "Agamemnon" – Araxos
 LGSA (CHQ) – Chania International Airport, "Ioannis Daskalogiannis" – Chania, Crete
 LGSD (---) – Sedes Airport – Sedes, Greece (military)
 LGSK (JSI) – Skiathos International Airport, "Alexandros Papadiamantis" – Skiathos
 LGSM (SMI) – Samos International Airport, "Aristarchos" – Samos
 LGSO (JSY) – Syros Island National Airport, "Dimitrios Vikelas" – Syros (Siros)
 LGSP (SPJ) – Sparti Airport – Sparti, Laconia (closed, may be open again by the Municipality of Sparti)
 LGSR (JTR) – Santorini (Thira) National Airport, "Zefiros" – Santorini (Thira)
 LGST (JSH) – Sitia Public Airport – Sitia, "Vitsentzos Kornaros" Crete
 LGSV (---) – Stefanovikio Airport – Stefanovikeio(military)
 LGSY (SKU) – Skyros Island National Airport, "Aegeon" – Skyros (Skiros)
 LGTG (---) – Tanagra Airport – Tanagra(military)
 LGTL (---) – Kasteli Airport – Kastelli (closed)
 LGTP (---) – Tripolis Airport – Tripoli (military, may be open for public after 2015)
 LGTS (SKG) – Thessaloniki International Airport, "Makedonia" – Thessaloniki
 LGTT (---) – Tatoi Airport – Tatoi(military)
 LGZA (ZTH) – Zakynthos International Airport, "Dionysios Solomos" – Zakynthos (Zakinthos)

LH – Hungary 

 LHBP (BUD) – Ferenc Liszt International Airport (Franz Liszt International Airport) – Budapest
 LHBS – Budaörs Airport – Budaörs
 LHDC (DEB) – Debrecen International Airport – Debrecen
 LHDK – Dunakeszi Airport – Dunakeszi
 LHDV – Dunaújváros Airport – Dunaújváros
 LHEC – Érsekcsanád Airport – Érsekcsanád
 LHEM – Esztergom Airport – Esztergom
 LHFH – Farkashegy Airport – Budakeszi
 LHFM – Fertőszentmiklós Airfield (Meidl Airport)– Fertőszentmiklós
 LHGD – Gödöllő Airport – Gödöllő
 LHHH – Hármas-határ-hegy Airfield – Budapest
 LHKD – Kecskéd Airport – Kecskéd
 LHKE – Kecskemét Air Base – Kecskemét (military)
 LHKK – Kiskunlacháza Airport – Kiskunlacháza
 LHJK – Jakabszállás Airport – Jakabszállás
 LHNY – Nyíregyháza Airport – Nyíregyháza
 LHOY – Őcsény Airport – Őcsény
 LHPA – Pápa Air Base – Pápa
 LHPP (PEV) – Pécs-Pogány International Airport – Pécs
 LHPR (QGY) – Győr-Pér International Airport – Győr, Pér
 LHPW  – Pusztaszer West Airport – Pusztaszer
 LHSA – Szentkirályszabadja Airport – Szentkirályszabadja
 LHSM (SOB) – Hévíz-Balaton Airport – Sármellék
 LHSN – Szolnok Air Base – Szolnok (military)
 LHSK – Siófok-Kiliti Airfield – Ságvár
 LHSY – Szombathely Airfield – Szombathely
 LHTA (TZR) – Taszár Air Base – Taszár (military)
 LHTL – Tököl Airport – Tököl
 LHUD – Szeged Airport – Szeged

LI – Italy (and San Marino) 

 LIAA (QIL) - Terni Alvaro Leonardi Airport - Terni
 LIAF – Foligno Airport – Foligno
 LIAP (QAQ) – Preturo Airport – L'Aquila
 LIAT – Pontedera Airport – Pontedera, Pisa
 LIAU – Capua Airport – Capua
 LIBA – Amendola Air Force Base – Foggia
 LIBC (CRV) – Crotone Airport (Sant'Anna Airport) – Crotone
 LIBD (BRI) – Bari Karol Wojtyla Airport – Bari
 LIBF (FOG) – Foggia "Gino Lisa" Airport – Foggia
 LIBG (TAR) – Taranto-Grottaglie "Marcello Arlotta" Airport – Taranto
 LIBN (LCC) – Galatina Air Base (military) – Lecce
 LIBP (PSR) – Abruzzo Airport – Pescara
 LIBR (BDS) – Brindisi Airport – Brindisi
 LIBV – Gioia del Colle Air Base – Gioia del Colle, Bari
 LIBX – Martina Franca Air Force Base – Martina Franca, Taranto
 LICA (SUF) – Lamezia Terme International Airport – Lamezia Terme, Catanzaro
 LICB (CIY) – Comiso Airport – Comiso, Ragusa
 LICC (CTA) – Catania-Fontanarossa Airport (Vincenzo Bellini Airport) – Catania
 LICD (LMP) – Lampedusa Airport – Lampedusa, Agrigento
 LICG (PNL) – Pantelleria Airport – Pantelleria, Trapani
 LICJ (PMO) – Falcone Borsellino Airport/Palermo Airport (formerly Punta Raisi Airport) – Palermo / Cinisi
 LICP – Palermo-Boccadifalco Airport (Giuseppe and Francesco Notarbartolo Airport) – Palermo
 LICR (REG) – Reggio di Calabria "Tito Minniti" Airport (Aeroporto dello Stretto) – Reggio Calabria
 LICT (TPS) – Trapani-Birgi Airport (Vincenzo Florio Airport) – Trapani
 LICZ (NSY) – Naval Air Station Sigonella – Lentini, Syracuse
 LIDA – Asiago Airport – Asiago, Vicenza
 LIDB (BLX) – Belluno Airport – Belluno
 LIDE (QIE) – Reggio Emilia Airport – Reggio Emilia
 LIDF – Fano Airport – Fano, Pesaro & Urbino
 LIDG – Lugo di Romagna Airport – Lugo di Romagna, Ravenna
 LIDH – Thiene Airport, Thiene, Province of Vicenza
 LIDR (RAN) – Ravenna Airport – Ravenna
 LIDT (QIT) – Trento-Mattarello Airport (G. Caproni Airport) – Trento
 LIDU – Carpi Budrione Airport – Carpi
 LIDV – Prati vecchi d'Aguscello – Ferrara
 LIEA (AHO) – Alghero - Riviera del Corallo Airport (Alghero-Fertilia Airport) – Alghero
 LIED (DCI) – Decimomannu Air Base – Decimomannu, Cagliari
 LIEE (CAG) – Cagliari Elmas Airport ("Mario Marmelli") – Cagliari
 LIEO (OLB) – Olbia Costa Smeralda Airport – Olbia
 LIER (FNU) – Oristano-Fenosu Airport – Oristano
 LIET (TTB) – Tortolì Airport – Tortolì
 LIKD – Torraccia airfield – Torraccia (San Marino)
 LIKO – Aviosuperficie di Ozzano – Guglielmo Zamboni – Ozzano dell'Emilia
 LILA – Alessandria Airport – Alessandria
 LILE (QIC) – Cerrione Airport – Biella
 LILG – Vergiate Airport – Vergiate, Varese
 LILH – Rivanazzano Airport – Voghera, Pavia
 LILM – Casale Monferrato Airport – Casale Monferrato
 LILN (QIV) – Varese-Venegono Airport – Varese
 LILQ – Massa Cinquale Airport – Massa
 LILR – Migliaro Airport – Cremona
 LILY – Como Idroscalo (water aerodrome) – Como
 LIMA (QIA) – Aeritalia Airport – Turin (Torino)
 LIMB (QIB) – Bresso Airfield – Milan
 LIMC (MXP) – Malpensa International Airport – Milan
 LIME (BGY) – Orio al Serio International Airport (Milan Bergamo Airport) – Bergamo
 LIMF (TRN) – Turin Airport (Torino Caselle Airport/Sandro Pertini Airport) – Turin (Torino)
 LIMG (ALL) – Riviera Airport (Albenga Airport/C. Panero Airport) – Villanova d'Albenga, Savona
 LIMJ (GOA) – Genoa Cristoforo Colombo Airport ("Christopher Columbus"/Genoa-Sestri Ponente Airport) – Genoa (Genova)
 LIML (LIN) – Linate Airport – Milan
 LIMN – Cameri Air Force Base – Cameri, Novara
 LIMP (PMF) – Parma Airport (Giuseppe Verdi Airport) – Parma
 LIMS – San Damiano Air Force Base – Piacenza
 LIMW (AOT) – Aosta Valley Airport (formerly Corrado Gex Airport) – Aosta
 LIMZ (CUF) – Cuneo International Airport (Cuneo Levaldigi Airport) – Cuneo
 LIPA (AVB) – Aviano Air Base – Aviano, Pordenone
 LIPB (BZO) – Bolzano Dolomiti Airport ("Francesco Baracca") – Bolzano, South Tyrol
 LIPC – Cervia Air Force Base – Cervia, Ravenna
 LIPD (UDN) – Campoformido Airport (military until 2008) – Campoformido / Udine
 LIPE (BLQ) – Bologna Airport ("Guglielmo Marconi") – Bologna
 LIPF – Ferrara Airport – Ferrara
 LIPH (TSF) – Treviso Airport (Sant'Angelo Airport) – Treviso
 LIPI – Rivolto Air Force Base – Rivolto / Udine
 LIPK (FRL) – Forlì Airport (L. Ridolfi Airport) – Forlì
 LIPL – Ghedi Air Base (military) – Ghedi, Brescia
 LIPM – Modena Marzaglia Airport – Modena
 LIPN (QIO) – Boscomantico Airport – Verona
 LIPO (VBS) – Brescia Airport ("Gabriele D'Annunzio"/Montichiari Airport) – Montichiari, Lombardy
 LIPQ (TRS) – Trieste - Friuli Venezia Giulia Airport (Ronchi dei Legionari Airport) – Ronchi dei Legionari / Trieste
 LIPR (RMI) – Federico Fellini International Airport – Rimini
 LIPS – Istrana Air Force Base – Treviso
 LIPT (VIC) – Vicenza Airport (“Tommaso Dal Molin”) – Vicenza
 LIPU (QIP) – Padua Airport (Gino Allegri Airport) – Padua (Padova)
 LIPV – Venice-Lido Airport (Giovanni Nicelli Airport) – Venice (Venezia)
 LIPX (VRN) – Verona Villafranca Airport (Valerio Catullo Airport) – Verona
 LIPY (AOI) – Falconara Airbase (Raffaello Sanzio Airport) – Ancona
 LIPZ (VCE) – Venice Marco Polo Airport (Marco Polo International Airport) – Venice (Venezia)
 LIQB (QZO) – Molin Bianco Airport – Arezzo
 LIQL (LCV) – Tassignano Airport – Lucca
 LIQN – Rieti Airport (G. Ciuffelli Airport) – Rieti
 LIQQ – Serristori Airfield – Manciano la Misericordia – Castiglion Fiorentino – Province of Arezzo
 LIQS (SAY) – Siena-Ampugnano Airport – Siena 
 LIQW – Luni Airport (military/Navy) – Sarzana, Genoa
 LIRA (CIA) – Ciampino-G. B. Pastine International Airport ("Giovan Battista Pastine") – Rome
 LIRC – Centocelle Air Force Base – Centocelle, Rome
 LIRE – Pratica di Mare Air Force Base – Pomezia, Rome
 LIRF (FCO) – Fiumicino International Airport ("Leonardo da Vinci") – Rome
 LIRG – Guidonia Air Force Base – Guidonia Montecelio, Rome
 LIRI (QSR) – Salerno Costa d'Amalfi Airport – Salerno
 LIRJ (EBA) – Marina di Campo Airport – Marina di Campo, Elba
 LIRL (QLT) – Latina Airport (military) – Latina
 LIRM – Grazzanise Air Base (military) – Caserta
 LIRN (NAP) – Naples International Airport (Capodichino Ugo Niutta Airport) – Naples
 LIRP (PSA) – Pisa International Airport ("Galileo Galilei" Airport) – Pisa
 LIRQ (FLR) – Florence Airport ("Amerigo Vespucci"/Peretola Airport) – Florence (Firenze)
 LIRS (GRS) – Grosseto Air Base – Grosseto
 LIRU – Rome Urbe Airport – Rome
 LIRV – (VTR—proposed) Viterbo Air Force Base / Rome Viterbo Airport – Viterbo
 LIRZ (PEG) – Perugia San Francesco d'Assisi – Umbria International Airport – Perugia

LJ – Slovenia 

 LJAJ – Ajdovščina Airport – Ajdovščina
 LJBL – Lesce-Bled Airport – Lesce
 LJBO – Bovec Airport – Bovec
 LJCE – Cerklje ob Krki Airport (military/civil) – Cerklje ob Krki, Brežice
 LJCL – Celje Airport – Celje (Levec)
 LJDI – Divača Airport – Divača
 LJLJ (LJU) – Ljubljana Jože Pučnik Airport (Brnik Airport) – Ljubljana
 LJMB (MBX) – Maribor Edvard Rusjan Airport – Maribor
 LJMS – Murska Sobota Airport – Murska Sobota (Rakičan)
 LJNM – Novo Mesto-Prečna Airport – Novo Mesto (Prečna)
 LJPO – Postojna Airport – Postojna
 LJPT – Ptuj Airport – Ptuj (Moškanjci)
 LJPZ (POW) – Portorož Airport – Portorož
 LJSG – Slovenj Gradec Airport – Slovenj Gradec
 LJSK – Slovenske Konjice Airport – Slovenske Konjice (Senožet)
 LJSO – Šoštanj Airport– Šoštanj (Lajše)

LK – Czech Republic 

 LKBA – Břeclav Airfield – Břeclav
 LKBE – Benešov Airfield – Benešov
 LKBO – Bohuňovice Airfield – Bohuňovice
 LKBR – Broumov Airport – Broumov
 LKBU – Bubovice Airfield – Bubovice
 LKCB – Cheb Airport – Cheb
 LKCE – Česká Lípa Airport – Česká Lípa
 LKCH – Chomutov Airport – Chomutov
 LKCM – Medlánky Airfield – Medlánky
 LKCR – Chrudim Airport – Chrudim
 LKCS – České Budějovice Airport – České Budějovice
 LKCT – Chotěboř Airport – Chotěboř
 LKCV – Čáslav Air Base – Čáslav
 LKDK – Dvůr Králové nad Labem Airport – Dvůr Králové nad Labem
 LKER – Erpužice Airport – Erpužice
 LKFR – Frýdlant Airport – Frýdlant
 LKHB – Havlíčkův Brod Airport – Havlíčkův Brod
 LKHC – Hořice Airport – Hořice
 LKHD – Hodkovice nad Mohelkou Airport – Hodkovice nad Mohelkou
 LKHK – Hradec Králové Airport – Hradec Králové
 LKHN – Hranice Airport – Hranice
 LKHO (GTW) – Holešov Airport – Holešov
 LKHS – Hosín Airport – Hosín
 LKHV – Hořovice Airport – Hořovice
 LKJA – Jaroměř Airport – Jaroměř
 LKJC – Jičín Airport – Jičín
 LKJH – Jindřichův Hradec Airport – Jindřichův Hradec
 LKJI – Jihlava Airport – Jihlava
 LKKA – Křižanov Airport – Křižanov
 LKKB – Prague–Kbely Airport (military) – Prague
 LKKC – Kříženec Airport – Kříženec
 LKKL – Kladno Airport – Kladno
 LKKM – Kroměříž Airport – Kroměříž
 LKKO – Kolín Airport – Kolín
 LKKR – Krnov Airport – Krnov
 LKKT – Klatovy Airfield – Klatovy
 LKKU (UHE) – Kunovice Airport – Kunovice
 LKKV (KLV) – Karlovy Vary Airport – Karlovy Vary
 LKKY – Kyjov Airport – Kyjov
 LKLN – Plzeň-Líně Airfield – Plzeň
 LKLT – Praha Letňany Airfield – Letňany
 LKMB – Mladá Boleslav Airport – Mladá Boleslav
 LKMH – Mnichovo Hradiště Airport – Mnichovo Hradiště
 LKMI – Mikulovice Airport – Mikulovice
 LKMK – Moravská Třebová Airport – Moravská Třebová
 LKMO – Most Airport – Most
 LKMR – Mariánské Lázně Airport (closed) – Mariánské Lázně
 LKMT (OSR) – Leoš Janáček Airport Ostrava (formerly Ostrava-Mošnov International Airport) – Ostrava
 LKNA – Náměšť Air Base – Náměšť nad Oslavou
 LKNM – Nové Město Airport – Nové Město nad Metují
 LKOL (OLO) – Olomouc Airport – Olomouc
 LKPA – Polička Airport – Polička
 LKPC – Panenský Týnec Airport – Panenský Týnec
 LKPD (PED) – Pardubice Airport – Pardubice
 LKPI – Přibyslav Airport – Přibyslav
 LKPL – Letkov Airport – Letkov
 LKPM – Příbram Airport – Příbram
 LKPN – Podhořany Airport – Podhořany
 LKPO (PRV) – Přerov Airport – Přerov
 LKPR (PRG) – Václav Havel Airport Prague – Prague
 LKPS – Plasy Airport – Plasy
 LKRA – Raná u Loun Airport – Raná u Loun
 LKRK – Rakovník Airfield – Rakovník
 LKRO – Roudnice Airport – Roudnice
 LKRY – Rokycany Airport – Rokycany
 LKSA – Staňkov Airport – Staňkov
 LKSB – Stichovice Airport – Mostkovice
 LKSK – Skuteč Airport – Skuteč
 LKSN – Slaný Airport – Slaný
 LKSO – Soběslav Airport – Soběslav
 LKSR – Strunkovice Airport – Strunkovice
 LKST – Strakonice Airport – Strakonice
 LKSU – Šumperk Airport – Šumperk
 LKSZ – Sazená Airport – Sazená
 LKTA – Tábor Airport – Tábor
 LKTB (BRQ) – Brno-Tuřany Airport – Brno
 LKTC – Točná Airport – Točná
 LKTD – Tachov Airport – Tachov
 LKTO – Toužim Airport – Toužim
 LKUL – Ústí nad Labem Airport – Ústí nad Labem
 LKUO – Ústí nad Orlicí Airport – Ústí nad Orlicí
 LKVL – Vlašim Airport – Vlašim
 LKVM – Vysoké Mýto Airport – Vysoké Mýto
 LKVO – Vodochody Airport – Vodochody
 LKVP – Velké Poříčí Airport – Velké Poříčí
 LKVR – Vrchlabí Airport – Vrchlabí
 LKVY – Vyškov Airport – Vyškov
 LKZA (ZBE) – Zábřeh Airport – Dolní Benešov
 LKZB – Zbraslavice Airport – Zbraslavice
 LKZD – Žatec-Macerka Airport – Žatec
 LKZL – Zlín Otrokovice Airfield – Otrokovice
 LKZM – Žamberk Airport – Žamberk
 LKZN – Znojmo Airport – Znojmo

LL – Israel 

 LLAZ (GHK) – Gaza Airstrip (formerly Gush Katif Airport) – Khan Yunis, Gaza Strip
 LLBG (TLV) – Ben Gurion International Airport – Tel Aviv
 LLBS (BEV) – Be'er Sheva Airport (Teyman Airport) – Beersheba (Be'er Sheva)
 LLEK – Tel Nof Israeli Air Force Base – Tel Nof (Tel Nov)
 LLER (ETM) – Ramon Airport – Eilat
 LLES – Ein Shemer Airfield – Ein Shemer (Eyn-Shemer)
 LLET (ETH) – Eilat Airport (J. Hozman Airport) – Eilat (closed since 19.3.2019)
 LLEY (EIY) – Ein Yahav Airfield – Ein Yahav (Eyn-Yahav)
 LLFK – Fiq Airfield – Fiq, Golan Heights
 LLHA (HFA) – Haifa International Airport (U. Michaeli Airport) – Haifa
 LLHB – Hatzerim Airbase (Hatzerim) – Beersheba (Be'er Sheva)
 LLHS – Hatzor Airbase – Hatzor
 LLHZ – Herzliya Airport – Herzliya (Herzlia)
 LLIB (RPN) – Rosh Pina Airport (Ben Ya'aqov Airport) – Rosh-Pina
 LLJR (JRS) – Atarot Airport (Jerusalem Airport) – Jerusalem (closed after the Second Intifada)
 LLKS (KSW) – Kiryat Shmona Airport – Kiryat Shmona (Qiryat Shemona)
 LLMG – Megiddo Airport (military) – Megiddo (Meggido)
 LLMR (MIP) – Mitzpe Ramon Airfield – Mitzpe Ramon
 LLMZ (MTZ) – Bar Yehuda Airfield – Masada
 LLNV – Nevatim Israeli Air Force Base – Nevatim
 LLOV (VDA) – Ovda Airport (former civil, now military only) – Negev
 LLRD – Ramat David Israeli Air Force Base – Megiddo
 LLRM – Ramon Airbase – Mitzpe Ramon
 LLSD (SDV) – Sde Dov Airport (Dov Hoz Airport) – Tel Aviv (closed since 1.7.2019)
 LLYT (YOT) – Yotvata Airfield – Yotvata

LM – Malta 

 LMMG (GZM) – Xewkija Heliport (Gozo Heliport) – Gozo
 LMML (MLA) – Malta International Airport (Luqa Airport) – Luqa

LN – Monaco 
No airports; helicopter service from Côte d'Azur International Airport in Nice, France

 LNMC (MCM) – Monaco Heliport – Monte Carlo

LO – Austria 

 LOAD       – Völtendorf Airfield – St. Pölten, Lower Austria
 LOAG       – Krems-Gneixendorf Airfield – Gneixendorf, Lower Austria
 LOAN       – Wiener Neustadt East Airport – Wiener Neustadt, Lower Austria
 LOAU       – Stockerau Airfield – Stockerau, Lower Austria
 LOAV       – Vöslau Airfield – Bad Vöslau, Lower Austria
 LOBI       – Mödling Krankenhaus Heliport – Landesklinikum Mödling, Mödling, Lower Austria
 LOGG       – Punitz Airfield – Güssing, Burgenland
 LOGT       – Leoben/Timmersdorf Airfield – Timmersdorf, Styria
 LOIH       – Hohenems-Dornbirn Airport  – Hohenems, Vorarlberg
 LOIR       – Reutte-Höfen Airfield – Reutte, Tyrol
 LOKF       – Feldkirchen Airfield – Ossiacher See, Carinthia
 LOLG       – St. Georgen Airfield – Leutzmannsdorf, Lower Austria
 LOLO       – Linz Ost Airfield (Linz East Airfield) – Linz, Upper Austria
 LOLU       – Gmunden Laakirchen Airfield – Gmunden, Upper Austria
 LOLW       – Wels Airport – Wels, Upper Austria
 LOWG (GRZ) – Graz Airport – Graz, Styria
 LOWI (INN) – Innsbruck Airport – Innsbruck, Tyrol
 LOWK (KLU) – Klagenfurt Airport (Kärnten Airport) – Klagenfurt, Carinthia
 LOWL (LNZ) – Linz Airport (Blue Danube Airport Linz) – Linz, Upper Austria
 LOWS (SZG) – Salzburg Airport (Salzburg Airport W.A. Mozart) – Salzburg, Salzburg
 LOWW (VIE) – Vienna International Airport (Wien-Schwechat Airport) – Schwechat, Lower Austria
 LOXA       – Aigen-Fiala Fernbrugg Air Base – Aigen im Ennstal, Styria
 LOXE       – Austrian Air Force–internal designation of Allentsteig Military Airfield (not officially listed by ICAO) – Allentsteig
 LOXG       – Austrian Air Force–designation of Graz-Nittner Air Base at Graz Airport (LOWG)
 LOXL       – Austrian Air Force–designation of Linz-Vogler Air Base at Linz Airport (LOWL)
 LOXN       – Wiener Neustadt West Airport – Wiener Neustadt, Lower Austria
 LOXT       – Langenlebarn Air Base also known as Fliegerhorst Brumowski – Tulln, Lower Austria
 LOXW       – Austrian Air Force–designation of Vienna International Airport (LOWW)
 LOXZ       – Zeltweg Air Base – Zeltweg, Styria

LP – Portugal 

         Planned: Lisbon / Alcochete / Peninsula de Setúbal
 LPAR – Alverca Air Base – Alverca do Ribatejo, Vila Franca de Xira
 LPAV – São Jacinto Airport (Aveiro Airport) – Aveiro
 LPBG (BGC) – Bragança Airport – Bragança
 LPBJ (BYJ) – Beja Air Base/Beja Airport – Beja
 LPBR (BGZ) – Braga Airport – Palmeira, Braga
 LPCH (CHV) – Chaves Airport – Chaves
 LPCO (CBP) – Coimbra Airport (Bissaya Barreto Aerodrome) – Coimbra
 LPCS (CAT) – Lisbon Cascais-Tejo Regional Airport (Cascais Municipal Aerodrome) – São Domingos de Rana, Cascais, Greater Lisbon
 LPCV (COV) – Covilhã Airport – Covilhã / Cova da Beira / Guarda / Beiras / Serra da Estrela (closed)
 LPEV – Évora Airport – Évora / Alentejo Central
 LPFR (FAO) – Faro Airport (Algarve Airport) – Faro / Algarve
 LPIN – Espinho Airport – Paramos / Silvalde / Espinho
 LPLG – Brigadeiro Franco Airport – Lagos
 LPMF – Monfortinho Airport – Monfortinho, Idanha-a-Nova
 LPMI – Mirandela Airport – Mirandela
 LPMO – Montargil Airport – Montargil, Ponte de Sor
 LPMR – Monte Real Air Base – Monte Real, Leiria
 LPMT – Montijo Air Base – Montijo
 LPMU – Mogadouro Aerodrome – Mogadouro
 LPOT – Ota Air Base – Ota, Alenquer
 LPOV – Ovar Air Base – Maceda, Ovar
 LPPM (PRM) – Portimão Airport – Portimão, Barlavento Algarvio
 LPPR (OPO) – Porto Airport (Francisco Sá Carneiro Airport) – Porto
 LPPT (LIS) – Lisbon Airport (Humberto Delgado Airport) – Portela / Lisbon
 LPPV – Praia Verde Airport – Altura
 LPSC – Santa Cruz Airport, Santa Cruz, Torres Vedras
 LPSI (SIE) – Sines Airport – Sines / Alentejo Litoral
 LPSR – Santarém Airport – Santarém
 LPST – Sintra Air Base – Granja do Marquês / Pero Pinheiro, Sintra
 LPTN – Tancos Air Base – Tancos, Vila Nova da Barquinha, Médio Tejo
 LPVL – Maia Airport (Vilar da Luz Airport) – Maia
 LPVM – Vilamoura Airport – Vilamoura / Quarteira, Loulé (closed)
 LPVR (VRL) – Vila Real Airport – Vila Real / Alto Douro
 LPVZ (VSE) – Viseu Airport (Gonçalves Lobato Airport) – Lordosa, Viséu

Azores 
 LPAZ (SMA) – Santa Maria Airport – Vila do Porto / Santa Maria Island 
 LPCR (CVU) – Corvo Airport – Vila do Corvo / Corvo Island
 LPFL (FLW) – Flores Airport – Santa Cruz das Flores / Flores Island
 LPGR (GRW) – Graciosa Airport – Santa Cruz da Graciosa / Graciosa Island
 LPHR (HOR) – Horta Airport – Horta / Faial Island
 LPLA (TER) – Lajes Air Base (Lajes Field) – Lajes / Terceira Island
 LPPD (PDL) – João Paulo II Airport (John Paul II Airport/Ponta Delgada Airport) – Ponta Delgada / São Miguel Island
 LPPI (PIX) – Pico Airport – Madalena / Pico Island
 LPSJ (SJZ) – São Jorge Airport – Velas / São Jorge Island

Madeira 
 LPMA (FNC) – Madeira Airport (Cristiano Ronaldo International Airport/Funchal Airport) – Funchal / Madeira Island
 LPPS (PXO) – Porto Santo Airport – Vila Baleira / Porto Santo Island

LQ – Bosnia and Herzegovina 

 LQBI – Bihać Golubić Airport – Bihać
 LQBK (BNX) – Banja Luka International Airport (Mahovljani Airport) – Banja Luka
 LQBU – Sarajevo Butmir – Butmir
 LQBZ – Banja Luka Zalužani Airport – Banja Luka
 LQCO – Ćoralići Airport – Ćoralići
 LQJL – Tuzla Jegen Lug Airport – Tuzla
 LQKU – Kupres Bajramovići Airport – Kupres
 LQLV – Livno Airport – Livno
 LQMJ – Mostar Jasenica Airport – Mostar
 LQMO (OMO) – Mostar International Airport – Mostar
 LQPD – Prijedor Airport – Prijedor
 LQSA (SJJ) – Sarajevo International Airport – Sarajevo
 LQSV – Sarajevo Military Airport – Sarajevo
 LQTG – Tomislavgrad Airport – Tomislavgrad
 LQTR – Novi Travnik Airport – Novi Travnik
 LQTZ (TZL) – Tuzla International Airport – Tuzla
 LQVI – Visoko Airport – Visoko
 LQCG - Živinice-Ciljuge (4km south from LQTZ) 
 LQGO - Gorice-Brčko

LR – Romania 

 LRAR (ARW) – Arad International Airport – Arad
 LRBC (BCM) – George Enescu International Airport – Bacău
 LRBG – IAR Gimbav Heliport – Brașov
 LRBM (BAY) – Maramureş International Airport – Baia Mare
 LRBN (BST) – Bistrița Airport – Bistrița
 LRBS (BBU) – Bucharest "Aurel Vlaicu" International Airport (Băneasa Airport) – Bucharest
 LRCK (CND) – Constanța "Mihail Kogălniceanu" International Airport – Constanța
 LRCL (CLJ) – Cluj International Airport – Cluj-Napoca
 LRCS (CSB) – Caransebeș Airport – Reșița
 LRCV (CRA) – Craiova International Airport – Craiova
 LRIA (IAS) – Iași International Airport – Iași
 LROD (OMR) – Oradea International Airport – Oradea
 LROP (OTP) – Bucharest "Henri Coandă" International Airport – Bucharest
 LROV – Brașov-Ghimbav International Airport – Ghimbav
 LRSB (SBZ) – Sibiu International Airport – Sibiu
 LRSM (SUJ) – Satu Mare International Airport – Satu Mare
 LRSV (SCV) – Suceava International Airport (Ștefan cel Mare Airport) – Suceava
 LRTC (TCE) – Tulcea Airport – Tulcea
 LRTM (TGM) – Târgu Mureș International Airport (Transilvania Airport) – Târgu-Mureș
 LRTR (TSR) – Timișoara "Traian Vuia" International Airport – Timișoara

LS – Switzerland 

Also see LF – France above, for EuroAirport Basel-Mulhouse-Freiburg 

 LSER       – Raron Heliport – Raron
 LSEZ       – Zermatt Heliport – Zermatt
 LSGB       – Bex Airport – Bex
 LSGC (ZHV) – Les Eplatures Airport – La Chaux-de-Fonds
 LSGE       – Fribourg-Ecuvillens Airfield – Fribourg
 LSGG (GVA) – Geneva Airport (Cointrin Airport) – Geneva
 LSGK (VVL) – Saanen Airport – Saanen
 LSGL (QLS) – Lausanne Airport – Lausanne
 LSGN (QNC) – Neuchâtel Airport – Neuchâtel
 LSGP       – La Côte Airport – La Côte
 LSGR       – Reichenbach Airport – Reichenbach
 LSGS (SIR) – Sion Airport – Sion (ICAO code applies to civilian airport)
 LSGT       – Gruyères Airport – Gruyères
 LSGY       – Yverdon-les-Bains Airport – Yverdon-les-Bains
 LSHC       – Collombey-Muraz Heliport – Collombey-Muraz
 LSHG       – Gampel Heliport – Gampel
 LSMA       – Alpnach Air Base – Alpnach (military)
 LSMD       – Dübendorf Air Base – Dübendorf (military)
 LSME (EML) – Emmen Air Base – Emmen (military)
 LSML       – Lodrino Air Base – Lodrino (military)
 LSMM       – Meiringen Air Base – Meiringen (military)
 LSMP       – Payerne Air Base – Payerne (military)
 LSMS       – Sion Air Base – Sion (military)
 LSPA       – Amlikon Airport – Amlikon
 LSPD       – Dittingen Airport – Dittingen
 LSPF       – Schaffhausen Airport – Schaffhausen
 LSPG       – Kägiswil Airport – Kägiswil
 LSPH       – Winterthur Airport – Winterthur
 LSPK       – Hasenstrick Airport – Hasenstrick
 LSPL       – Langenthal Airport – Langenthal
 LSPM       – Ambri Airport – Ambrì
 LSPN       – Triengen Airport – Triengen
 LSPO       – Olten Airport – Olten
 LSPV       – Wangen-Lachen Airport – Wangen
 LSTA       – Raron Airfield – Raron
 LSTB       – Bellechasse Airport – Bellechasse
 LSTO       – Môtiers Airport – Môtiers
 LSTR       – Montricher Airport – Montricher
 LSTS       – St. Stephan Airport – St. Stephan
 LSXB       – Balzers Heliport – Balzers
 LSXG       – Gsteigwiler Heliport – Gsteigwiler
 LSXI       – Interlaken Heliport – Interlaken
 LSXK       – Benken Heliport – Benken
 LSXL       – Lauterbrunnen Heliport – Lauterbrunnen
 LSXO       – St. Gallen-Winkeln Heliport – St. Gallen
 LSXS       – Schindellegi Heliport – Schindellegi
 LSXT       – Trogen Heliport – Trogen
 LSXU       – Untervaz Heliport – Untervaz
 LSXW       – Würenlingen Heliport – Würenlingen
 LSXY       – Leysin Heliport – Leysin
 LSZA (LUG) – Lugano Airport – Lugano / Agno
 LSZB (BRN) – Bern Airport – Bern (Berne) / Belp
 LSZC (BXO) – Buochs Airport – Buochs
 LSZD       – Ascona Airfield – Ascona (closed)
 LSZE       – Bad Ragaz Airport – Bad Ragaz
 LSZF       – Birrfeld Airport – Birrfeld
 LSZG (ZHI) – Grenchen Airport – Grenchen
 LSZH (ZRH) – Zurich Airport (Zurich-Kloten Airport) – Zürich / Kloten
 LSZI       – Fricktal-Schupfart Airport – Fricktal
 LSZJ       – Courtelary Airport – Courtelary
 LSZK       – Speck-Fehraltorf Airport – Speck
 LSZL (ZJI) – Locarno Airport – Locarno
 LSZM       – Mollis Airport – Mollis
 LSZN       – Hausen am Albis Airport – Hausen am Albis
 LSZO       – Luzern-Beromünster Airport – Luzern
 LSZP       – Biel-Kappelen Airport – Biel
 LSZR (ACH) – St. Gallen-Altenrhein Airport – St. Gallen / Altenrhein
 LSZS (SMV) – Samedan Airport (Engadin Airport) – Samedan
 LSZT       – Lommis Airport – Lommis
 LSZU       – Buttwil Airport – Buttwil
 LSZV       – Sitterdorf Airport – Sitterdorf
 LSZW       – Thun Airport – Thun
 LSZX       – Schänis Airport – Schänis
 LSZY       – Porrentruy Airport – Porrentruy

LT – Turkey 

 LTAB       – Ankara Güvercinlik Army Air Base – Güvercinlik / Ankara
 LTAC (ESB) – Esenboğa International Airport – Ankara
 LTAD (ANK) – Etimesgut Air Base – Ankara
 LTAE       – Mürted Air Base – Ankara
 LTAF (ADA) – Adana Şakirpaşa Airport – Adana
 LTAG (UAB) – Incirlik Air Base – Adana
 LTAH (AFY) – Afyon Airport – Afyonkarahisar
 LTAI (AYT) – Antalya Airport – Antalya
 LTAJ (GZT) – Oğuzeli Airport – Gaziantep
 LTAK       – İskenderun Airport – İskenderun, Hatay (closed)
 LTAL (KFS) – Kastamonu Airport – Kastamonu
 LTAM    – Kayseri Airport – Kayseri (closed)
 LTAN (KYA) – Konya Airport – Konya
 LTAO       – Malatya Tulga Air Base – Malatya
 LTAP (MZH) – Amasya Merzifon Airport – Merzifon, Amasya
 LTAQ (SSX) – Samsun Samair Airport – Samsun
 LTAR (VAS) – Sivas Airport (Nuri Demirag Airport) – Sivas
 LTAS (ONQ) – Zonguldak Airport – Zonguldak
 LTAT (MLX) – Malatya Erhaç Airport – Malatya
 LTAU (ASR) – Erkilet International Airport (Kayseri Erkilet Airport) – Kayseri
 LTAV       – Sivrihisar Air Base – Sivrihisar, Eskişehir
 LTAW (TJK) – Tokat Airport – Tokat
 LTAX       – Ereğli Erdemir Airport – Karadeniz Ereğli, Zonguldak
 LTAY (DNZ) – Denizli Çardak Airport – Denizli
 LTAZ (NAV) – Nevşehir Kapadokya Airport – Nevşehir
 LTBA (ISL) – Atatürk International Airport – Istanbul
 LTBC       – Alaşehir Airport – Alaşehir, Manisa
 LTBD       – Aydın Airport – Aydın
 LTBE (BTZ) – Bursa Airport – Bursa
 LTBF (BZI) – Balıkesir Airport – Balıkesir
 LTBG (BDM) – Bandırma Airport – Bandırma, Balıkesir
 LTBH (CKZ) – Çanakkale Airport – Çanakkale
 LTBI (ESK) – Eskişehir Airport – Eskişehir
 LTBJ (ADB) – Adnan Menderes Airport – İzmir
 LTBK       – Gaziemir Air Base – İzmir
 LTBL (IGL) – Çiğli Airport – İzmir
 LTBM       – Isparta Airport – Isparta
 LTBN       – Kütahya Air Base – Kütahya
 LTBO (USQ) – Uşak Airport – Uşak
 LTBP       – Yalova Air Base – Yalova
 LTBQ (KCO) – Cengiz Topel Naval Air Station – Kocaeli
 LTBR (YEI) – Yenişehir Airport – Bursa
 LTBS (DLM) – Dalaman Airport – Dalaman, Muğla
 LTBT       – Akhisar Air Base – Akhisar, Manisa
 LTBU (TEQ) – Tekirdağ Çorlu Airport – Çorlu, Tekirdağ
 LTBV (BXN) – Bodrum-Imsik Airport – Bodrum
 LTBW       – Istanbul Hezarfen Airfield – Istanbul
 LTBX       – Istanbul Samandıra Army Air Base – Istanbul
 LTBY (AOE) – Hasan Polatkan Airport – Eskişehir
 LTBZ (KZR) – Zafer Airport – Kütahya
 LTCA (EZS) – Elazığ Airport – Elazığ
 LTCB (OGU) – Ordu-Giresun Airport – Ordu
 LTCC (DIY) – Diyarbakır Airport – Diyarbakır
 LTCD (ERC) – Erzincan Airport – Erzincan
 LTCE (ERZ) – Erzurum Airport – Erzurum
 LTCF (KSY) – Kars Harakani Airport – Kars
 LTCG (TZX) – Trabzon Airport – Trabzon
 LTCH (SFQ) – Şanlıurfa Airport – Şanlıurfa (closed)
 LTCI (VAN) – Van Ferit Melen Airport – Van
 LTCJ (BAL) – Batman Airport – Batman
 LTCK (MSR) – Muş Airport (Sultan Alparsian Airport) – Muş
 LTCL (SXZ) – Siirt Airport – Siirt
 LTCM (NOP SIC) – Sinop Airport – Sinop
 LTCN (KCM) – Kahramanmaraş Airport – Kahramanmaraş
 LTCO (AJI) – Ağrı Airport (Ahmed-i Hami Airport) – Ağrı
 LTCP (ADF) – Adıyaman Airport – Adıyaman
 LTCR (MQM) – Mardin Airport – Mardin
 LTCS (GNY) – Şanlıurfa GAP Airport – Şanlıurfa
 LTCT (IGD) – Iğdır Airport – Iğdır
 LTCU (BGG) – Bingöl Airport – Bingöl
 LTCV (NKT) – Şırnak Airport (Şerafettin Elçi Airport) – Cizre
 LTCW (YKO) – Hakkari–Yüksekova Airport (Selahaddin Eyyubi Airport) – Yüksekova
 LTDA (HTY) – Hatay Airport – Antakya, Hatay
 LTFA       – Kaklıç Air Base – İzmir
 LTFB       – Selçuk-Efes Airport – Selçuk, İzmir
 LTFC (ISE) – Isparta Süleyman Demirel Airport – Isparta
 LTFD (EDO) – Balıkesir Koca Seyit Airport – Edremit, Balıkesir
 LTFE (BJV) – Milas–Bodrum Airport – Milas, Muğla
 LTFG (GZP) – Gazipaşa-Alanya Airport – Gazipaşa, Antalya
 LTFH (SZF) – Samsun-Çarşamba Airport – Samsun
 LTFJ (SAW) – Sabiha Gökçen International Airport – Istanbul
 LTFK (GKD) – Gökçeada Airport – Gökçeada, Çanakkale
 LTFL       – Keşan Air Base – Keşan
 LTFM (IST) – Istanbul Airport – Istanbul

LU – Moldova 

 LUBL (BZY) – Bălți International Airport – Bălți
 LUBM       – Mărculești Air Force Base – Mărculești
 LUCH       – Cahul International Airport – Cahul
 LUCL       – Ceadîr-Lunga Airport – Ceadîr-Lunga
 LUCM       – Camenca Airport – Camenca
 LUKK (KIV) – Chișinău International Airport – Chișinău
 LUSR       – Soroca Airport – Soroca
 LUTG       – Tighina Airport – Tighina
 LUTR       – Tiraspol Airport – Tiraspol

LV – State of Palestine 

 LVGZ (GZA) – Yasser Arafat International Airport (formerly Gaza International Airport) – Rafah
Also see LL – Israel section above, for:
 Gaza Airstrip
 Atarot Airport

LW – North Macedonia 

 LWOH (OHD) – Ohrid St. Paul the Apostle Airport – Ohrid
 LWSK (SKP) – Skopje International Airport – Skopje

LX – Gibraltar 

 LXGB (GIB) – Gibraltar International Airport – Gibraltar

LY – Serbia and Montenegro

Serbia 

 LYBE (BEG) – Belgrade Airport (Nikola Tesla Airport) – Belgrade
 LYBT (BJY) – Batajnica Air Base – Batajnica / Belgrade
 LYBJ (LJB) – Lisičji Jarak Airport – Padinska Skela / Belgrade
 LYKV (KVO) – Morava Airport (Lađevci Airport) – Kraljevo
 LYNI (INI) – Niš Constantine the Great Airport – Niš
 LYNS (QND) – Novi Sad Airport (Čenej Airport) – Novi Sad
 LYPA – Pančevo Airport – Pančevo
 LYTR (TRE) – Trstenik Airport – Trstenik
 LYUZ (UZC) – Ponikve Airport – Užice
 LYVR – Vršac Airport – Vršac
 LYZR – Zrenjanin Airport – Zrenjanin

Montenegro 

 LYBR (IVG) – Berane Airport (Dolac Airport) – Berane, Montenegro
 LYPJ – Podgorica Airbase – Golubovci, Montenegro
 LYNK – Kapino Polje Airport – Nikšić, Montenegro
 LYPG (TGD) – Podgorica Airport – Podgorica, Montenegro
 LYPO – Špiro Mugoša Airport (Ćemovsko Polje Airport) – Podgorica, Montenegro
 LYTV (TIV) – Tivat Airport – Tivat, Montenegro

LZ – Slovakia 

 LZDB       – Slavnica Airport – Dubnica nad Váhom
 LZHL       – Holíč Airport – Holíč
 LZIB (BTS) – Bratislava Airport (Milan Rastislav Štefánik Airport) – Bratislava
 LZJS       – Aerodrome Jasna – Jasná
 LZKC       – Kamenica nad Cirochou Airport – Kamenica nad Cirochou
 LZKS       – Kráľová Airport – Kráľová pri Senci
 LZKZ (KSC) – Košice International Airport – Košice
 LZLU (LUE) – Boľkovce Airport – Lučenec
 LZMA       — Martin Airfield — Martin
 LZMC       — Malacky Air Base – Malacky
 LZNI       – Nitra Airport – Nitra
 LZNZ       – Nové Zámky Airport – Nové Zámky
 LZOC       – Očová Airport – Očová
 LZPE       – Prievidza Airport – Prievidza
 LZPP (PZY) – Piešťany Airport – Piešťany
 LZPT       – Malé Bielice Airport – Partizánske
 LZPW (POV) – Prešov Air Base – Prešov
 LZRU       – Ružomberok Airport – Ružomberok
 LZRY       – Ražňany Airport – Ražňany
 LZSE       – Senica Airport – Senica
 LZSK       – Svidník Airport – Svidník
 LZSL (SLD) – Sliač Airport (Letisko Tri Duby Airport) – Sliač
 LZSV       – Spišská Nová Ves Airport – Spišská Nová Ves
 LZSY       – Šurany Airport – Šurany
 LZTN        –Trenčín Airfield – Trenčín
 LZTR       – Boleráz Airport – Trnava
 LZTT (TAT) – Poprad-Tatry Airport – Poprad
 LZZI (ILZ) – Žilina Airport – Žilina

References

 
  – includes IATA codes
 Aviation Safety Network – IATA and ICAO airport codes

L
Albania transport-related lists
Austria transport-related lists
Bosnia and Herzegovina transport-related lists
Bulgaria transport-related lists
Croatia transport-related lists
Cyprus transport-related lists
Czech Republic transport-related lists
France transport-related lists
Greece transport-related lists
Hungary transport-related lists
Malta transport-related lists
Israel transport-related lists
Italy transport-related lists
North Macedonia transport-related lists
Moldova transport-related lists
Portugal transport-related lists
Romania transport-related lists
Serbia transport-related lists
Slovakia transport-related lists
Slovenia transport-related lists
Switzerland transport-related lists
Turkey transport-related lists